Of Love and Desire is a 1963 film directed by Richard Rush and starring Merle Oberon, Steve Cochran and Curd Jürgens.

Plot
American engineer Steve Corey moves to Mexico to work at one of the mining projects owned by Katherine Beckman and her half-brother Paul. He finally is introduced to Katherine, and the man that he is taking over for, Bill Maxton, informs him that Katherine is his for the taking: "All you have to do is touch her—she goes off like fireworks. There were plenty of guys before me, and there'll be plenty after me."

Steve thinks that Katherine is what he expected but ends up developing a crush on her. As their relationship develops, Paul gets upset and reintroduces her ex-boyfriend Gus Cole to her to lure her away from Steve. Half-siblings Katherine and Paul are carrying some emotional damage from the past which they need to work out.

Principal cast

Critical reception
From online reviewer website Cool Cinema Trash:

Soundtrack

References

External links 
 
 
 

1963 films
Films directed by Richard Rush
Films set in Mexico
Films shot in Mexico
Films scored by Ronald Stein
1960s English-language films